Antioquia is one of the 32 departments of Colombia, located in the central Northwestern part of Colombia with a narrow section that borders the Caribbean Sea. Most of its territory is mountainous with some valleys, much of which is part of the Andes mountain range. Antioquia has been part of many territorial divisions of former countries created within the present-day territory of Colombia. Prior to adoption of the Colombian Constitution of 1886, Antioquia State had its own sovereign government.

The department covers an area of 63,612 km2 (24,427 sq mi), and has a population of 5,819,358 (2006 estimate); 6.6 million (2010 estimate). Antioquia borders the Córdoba Department and the Caribbean Sea to the north; Chocó to the west; the departments of Bolivar, Santander, and Boyaca to the east; and the departments of Caldas and Risaralda to the south.

Medellín is Antioquia's capital city, and the second-largest city in the country. Other important towns are Santa Fe de Antioquia, the old capital located on the Cauca River, and Puerto Berrío on the Magdalena.

Geography 
Antioquia is the sixth-largest Department of Colombia. It is predominantly mountainous, crossed by the Cordillera Central and the Cordillera Occidental of the Andes. The Cordillera Central divides to form the Aburrá valley, in which the capital, Medellín, is located. The Cordillera Central forms the plateaus of Santa Rosa de Osos and Rionegro.

While 80% of the department's territory is mountainous, Antioquia also has lowlands in Bajo Cauca, Magdalena Medio, and eastern Sonsón, as well as coastline on the Caribbean Sea, in Urabá. This area has a tropical climate and is of high strategic importance due to its location.

History

Native people of Antioquia 
Before Spanish colonization, different indigenous tribes inhabited this part of modern Colombia. Their origin is uncertain, as specialists believe that some came from the Caribbean island, and others that they originated among peoples along the interior Amazon River. 

Antioquia was primarily populated by the Carib people. Some scattered groups of Muisca were said to be present in the Darién region (in modern-day Panama), a coastal region in the far north of Antioquia. But, no historical records refer to Muisca in Antioquia.

The Carib occupying territory in Antioquia were known by classifications of smaller groups, called families.  Some of the most prominent native families in the region include the Catía, Nutabe, and Tahamíe, who all inhabited the central region of Antioquia.

The Quimbaya occupied southern Antioquia.

The historic Quimbaya, Carib and Muisca tribes were the most prominent groups encountered by the conquistadors upon their arrival in Antioquia. The Quimbaya had a lot to do with the development of the department.

The Spaniards had a turbulent history of encounters with the Carib. Although the tribe was numerous and known for its warring culture, the various peoples of this family became dominated or exterminated by the Spaniards in the process of conquest and colonization. As did all Native Americans, they suffered extremely high mortality due to newly introduced infectious Eurasian diseases, to which they had no immunity.

In some cases the surviving natives dispersed to evade the Spanish, and some committed suicide to escape being  enslaved or subjected to forced labor. Many survivors fled to the modern department of Chocó. In Antioquia, the natives disappeared almost completely. At present, the autochthon population of the department of Antioquia scarcely reaches 0.5% of the total population, even though the vast majority of locals have a significant indigenous genetic component (26% in average).

Basque influence in Antioquia 

A debate, centered around the apparently significant Jewish origin of Antioquians, took place from mid-nineteenth century to the twentieth century. Others, later pointed to  Basque origins as a way to understand the population's idiosyncrasies. Prominent among these, were two American historians: Everett Hagen and Leonard Kasdan. Hagen looked at the telephone directory in Medellin in 1957 and found that 15% of the surnames were of Basque origin, finding then that employers in the percentage of surnames was up to 25%, which led him to conclude that Basque settlers were very important in explaining the increased industrial development of Antioquia in the Colombian context. These ideas were supported by representatives of developmental theories, who sought to justify business growth based on "the character of social groups."

Euskera (Basque language) in Antioquia 
The use of Basque language (Euskera) terminology in the present territory of Colombia goes back to the early exploration in 1499, during the third voyage of Columbus, it is said that from that time the territory experienced a strong presence of Basques, including prominent figures such as the pilot and geographer Juan de la Cosa, nicknamed "el vizcaino". (Some sources claim that he was not a native of the Basque Country, but was born in Santoña, Cantabria).

More Basque colonists reached this area and began to settled in the region. The Colombian department of Antioquia has been considered a major route of the Basque immigration, mainly during the colonial era. Hundreds of Basques migrated as settlers sponsored by the Spanish colonization companies.

People who were interested in investigating the presence of the Basque people in the department of Antioquia and Colombia have been troubled by the question that relates to the use and retention of the Basque language in their current territories.

It is estimated, for example, for smaller Antioquia, a region where hundreds of Spaniards arrived, of which a good portion were Basque, some limited aspects of the culture and traditions were brought by Basque settlers, though without any mention of their particular language, thus tracking the use of Basque in the current Antioquia and Colombia. However, this is partly due to the Basque language always having been an outcast, which apparently left no written evidence in Antioquia.

Antioquia Basque speech 
The current Spanish dialect in Antioquia, closely observed, has obvious influences from Basque. Basque influence is evident in words such  (useless, inept) and 'tap' (tap), to name only a few cases.

Spaniards in Antioquia 
The first Spaniard known to have visited the territory now known as Antioquia was Rodrigo de Bastidas, who explored the area around the future site of Darién in 1500. Ten years later, Alonso de Ojeda founded San Sebastián de Urabá, 2 km from the present-day town of Necoclí. It was later destroyed by the natives. The first Spanish military incursion into Antioquia, however, was not made until 1537. An expedition commanded by Francisco César traveled through the lands of chief Dabeiba, arriving at the Cauca River. They were said to have taken important treasures from the indigenous people's tombs. In response, the warriors of chief Nutibara harassed the Spaniards continually, and forced them to return to Urabá.

In 1541, the conquistador Jorge Robledo departed from the site of the future (1542) Spanish town of Arma, a little below Aguadas in the North of Caldas, to lead an expedition north on the Cauca River.

Farther north, Robledo would found the city of Santa Fe de Antioquia, which in 1813 was declared the capital of the sovereign and independent state of Antioquia, and remained the seat of the governate until 1826, when Medellin was designated the capital.

Other Spaniards who settled Antioquia came from Extremadura, Andalusia, and the Canary Islands. The Extremadurans influenced the pronunciation of the letter 's' as an apico-alveolar, like Basques. Andalusians and Canarians influenced seseo in the Spanish dialect.

Toponymy 
The reason behind the chosen name for the department is not historically clear. The most accepted explanation is that the name for the, then Greek-Syrian (now Turkish), Hellenistic city of Antioch on the Orontes ( Antiocheia,  Arabic: Antākiyyah, today Antakya) was used since the region known as the Coffee Zone in Colombia, in which many towns and cities are named after cities in the Middle East, has a very strong Judeo-Arabic influence, both demographically and culturally. Additionally, the city in mention played a significant role in the development of early Christian communities thus religiously important for Roman Catholic Spaniard conquerors. Others state that it is named after some of the many other Hellenistic ancient cities in the Middle East named Antiochia, which were founded as well by some of the Antiochus Kings during the Seleucid Empire (312–63 BC).

16th to the 21st centuries 
Due to its geographical isolation (as it is located among mountains), Antioquia suffered supply problems. Its topography did not allow for much agriculture, so the city became dependent upon trade, especially of gold and gin for the colonization of new land. Much of this trade was due to reforms passed after a 1785 visit from Juan Antonio Mon y Velarde, an inspector of the Spanish Crown. The Antioquia became colonizers and traders.

The department was hard hit by the Colombian conflict, with 30,000 people missing between 1997 and 2005.

The Wall Street Journal and Citi announced in the year 2013 that Medellín, the capital of the Department of Antioquia, is the winner of the City of the Year competition, a global program developed in partnership with the Urban Land Institute to recognize the most innovative urban centers. Medellín was ranked above the other finalists, Tel Aviv and New York City.

Administrative divisions

Regions and municipalities 
Antioquia is divided into nine subregions to facilitate the Department's administration. These nine regions contain a total of 125 municipalities. The nine subregions with their municipalities are:

Demographics 

The population of Antioquia is 6,613,118 (2017 estimate), of which more than half live in the metropolitan area of Medellín. The racial composition is:

 White / Mestizo (88.6%)
 Black or Afro-Colombian (10.9%)
 Indigenous or Amerindian (0.5%)

During the 16th and 18th centuries, Antioquia received many immigrants from Spain (Especially the northern Spain). Most Indigenous peoples died from the introduction of European diseases, and many of those who survived intermarried with early Spanish settlers, who were mostly men; later, Spanish women also began to immigrate. Thousands of Irish, Scottish and English who settled in Antioquia fought for the Colombian army during independence. During the 19th and 20th centuries, immigrants (includiding jews) arrived from Italy, Germany, United Kingdom, France, Portugal, Lebanon, Israel, Palestina and Syria. Many people from Antioquia are referred to as Paisas, people of mainly Spanish ancestry, a lot of them Basque. There is a small Afro-Colombian and Zambo-Colombian (people of Indigenous and African descent) population originating in the majority of the Urabá subregion and the neighboring departments of Chocó, Córdoba and Sucre.

Notable people 
 
 
Walter Noriega (1979) footballer
Maluma (1994) singer, songwriter, and actor
J Balvin (1985) singer 
Karol G (1991) singer and songwriter
Juanes (1972) musician 
Sebastián Yatra (1994) singer, songwriter, and actor
Camilo (1994) singer, musician and songwriter

See also 
 Coat of arms of Antioquia Department
 List of municipalities in Antioquia
 Postage stamps and postal history of Antioquia

Notes and references

External links

 Map of the Province of Antioquia from 1809

 
1826 establishments in Gran Colombia
Departments of Colombia
States and territories established in 1826